A Splendid Exchange: How Trade Shaped The World (London: Atlantic Books, 2008) is a book by American author William Bernstein.

Summary
The book describes the history of world trade in detail. The author begins from Mesopotamian times and then describes the exploits of Vasco da Gama.

Reception
It has been reviewed by The Guardian, The New York Times, and The Economist.

See also
 The Birth of Plenty

References

External links
 Official Website
 Google Books
 

2008 non-fiction books
Books about economic history
English-language books